The Chapada Diamantina National Park is a national park in the Chapada Diamantina region of the State of Bahia, Brazil.
The terrain is rugged, and mainly covered by flora of the Caatinga biome.

Location

It was created by decree 91.655 of 17 September 1985, and is administered by the Chico Mendes Institute for Biodiversity Conservation.
The park covers parts of the municipalities of Palmeiras, Mucugê, Lençóis, Ibicoara and Andaraí in the state of Bahia.

Terrain 
The plateau forms a watershed, draining on one side into the São Francisco River and on the other into the De Contas River and Paraguaçu River.

The park lies in the rugged Sincorá Range in the east of the plateau, an area of folded and heavily eroded structures. The highest point of the state is in the park, the  Pico do Barbado. Both gold and diamonds have been found in the range. The range forces moist air moving west from sea upward which causes higher levels of rainfall, particularly in the east. There are many systems of caves formed by the rivers of the region.

Flora and fauna 

Endemic flora include Adamantinia miltonioides, Cattleya elongata, Cattleya tenuis, Cattleya x tenuata, Cleites libonni and Cleistes metallina. The hooded visorbearer (Augastes lumachellus) hummingbird is endemic. There are few large mammals, but many species of small mammals, reptiles, amphibians, birds and insects.

Conservation 
The park is classed as IUCN protected area category II (national park). It has the objectives of preserving natural ecosystems of great ecological relevance and scenic beauty, enabling scientific research, environmental education, outdoors recreation and eco-tourism. Protected birds in the reserve include white-necked hawk (Buteogallus lacernulatus), Chaco eagle (Buteogallus coronatus), Bahia tyrannulet (Phylloscartes beckeri), ochre-marked parakeet (Pyrrhura cruentata) and Bahia spinetail (Synallaxis whitneyi).

Other protected species include Barbara Brown's titi (Callicebus barbarabrownae), cougar (Puma concolor), jaguar (Panthera onca), oncilla (Leopardus tigrinus), giant armadillo (Priodontes maximus) and giant anteater (Myrmecophaga tridactyla).

Notes

References

Bibliography 

 
 
 
 
 

National parks of Brazil
Protected areas of Bahia
1985 establishments in Brazil
Caatinga